The Hon. Ralph Heneage Dutton (5 August 1821 – 8 October 1892), was a British Conservative politician.

Background
Dutton was the third and youngest son of John Dutton, 2nd Baron Sherborne, by his marriage to the Hon. Mary Legge, only child and heiress of Henry Bilson-Legge, 2nd Baron Stawell.

Political career
Dutton was elected Member of Parliament for Hampshire South in 1857, a seat he held until 1865, and then represented Cirencester until 1868.

Family
Dutton married Isabella, daughter of John Mansfield, in 1848. He died in October 1892, aged 71. They had one daughter, Isabella Mary Dutton (1854-1936) who married Sir John Simeon, 4th Baronet.

References

External links 
 

1821 births
1892 deaths
Younger sons of barons
Conservative Party (UK) MPs for English constituencies
UK MPs 1857–1859
UK MPs 1859–1865
UK MPs 1865–1868